Jiří Moskal (born May 3, 1948 in Jablonec nad Nisou., Czechoslovakia) is a former Czech rally raid driver at the Dakar Rally in the truck category. He also won 1981 Cup of Peace and Friendship.

Dakar Rally results

References

Living people
1948 births
Sportspeople from Jablonec nad Nisou
Czech rally drivers
Off-road racing drivers
Dakar Rally drivers